The Comenius programme is a European Union educational project. It concerns school-level education, and is part of the EU's Erasmus + 2014-2020 Programme. It aims "to help young people and educational staff better understand the range of European cultures, languages and values".

Its name derives from the 17th-century Czech educator John Amos Comenius.

Programs
The program is focussed on several areas: 
The basic problems of learning motivation, and skills in learning how to learn; 
The key skills of Language learning, greater literacy, science learning, learning to support entrepreneurship, and the development of creativity and innovation;
Digital education, both content and services; 
Improving school management, of teaching, and teacher education; 
Reducing socio-economic disadvantages and discouraging early school leaving; 
Increasing participation in sports; 
Educating groups of students with diverse abilities; 
Development of early and pre-primary learning.

The goal of the program is to have participation of more than three million students and teachers in international activities, thus improving mobility of students and teachers in the EU.

See also
Erasmus programme
Grundtvig programme
Leonardo da Vinci programme
Transversal programme
Jean Monnet programme

References

External links

Educational policies and initiatives of the European Union